The 2008–09 Biathlon World Cup – Sprint Men started on Saturday 6 December 2008 in Östersund and finished on Thursday 26 March 2009 in Khanty-Mansiysk. The defending titlist was Ole Einar Bjørndalen of Norway.

The small crystal globe winner for the category was Ole Einar Bjørndalen of Norway.

Competition format
The  sprint race is the third oldest biathlon event; the distance is skied over three laps. The biathlete shoots two times at any shooting lane, first prone, then standing, totalling 10 targets. Competitors' starts are staggered, normally by 30 seconds.

2007–08 Top 3 standings

Medal winners

Final standings

References

Biathlon World Cup - Sprint Men, 2008-09